Ian Kerr may refer to:
Ian Kerr (academic) (1965–2019), Canadian academic and expert in emerging law and technology issues
Ian Kerr (field hockey) (born 1935), New Zealand Olympic field hockey player
Ian M. Kerr, scientist at University College London
Ian Kerr Cook (1924–1989), Scottish footballer
Ian Mackenzie-Kerr (1929–2005), British book designer